Theta Delphini, a name Latinized from θ Delphini, is a single star in the northern constellation of Delphinus. It has an apparent visual magnitude of about 5.7, meaning that it is just barely visible to the naked eye under excellent viewing conditions. The distance to this star is approximately 2,050 light years from the Sun based on parallax. It is drifting closer with a radial velocity of −15 km/s.

The stellar classification of Theta Delphini is K3Ib, which means it is a K-type supergiant. These types of stars form when relatively massive (10 to ) stars like B-type main sequence stars run out of hydrogen to fuse and start cooling down. It has been described as a super-metal-rich star because of its high metallicity.

References

K-type supergiants
Delphinus (constellation)
Delphini, Theta
BD+12 4411
Delphini, 08
196725
101882
7892